Central House of Officers of the Armed Forces of Ukraine is a cultural center located in Kyiv, Ukraine. Since its recent reorganization, Central Officers House has become one of the leading cultural centers in the Ukrainian capital city.

History

The building was initially built between 1914 and 1915 as a military flight school. It was later repeatedly reconstructed up until 1931. It was renamed to the House of the Red Army and Navy in 1933. In the early post-war years, when the whole city of Kyiv was in ruins, and there were practically no audience halls. Many of the original concert halls were rebuilt during the Khrushchev and Brezhnev eras, while new halls were also created. Since Ukrainian independence was achieved in 1991, the house of officers was, for the most part, converted into a museum.

National Military History Museum
Since October 1995, the Central Museum of the Armed Forces has operated in the building. Prior to this, the museum formerly served as the Historical Museum of Kyiv Military District. More than 100 years ago, on 28 December 1910, the Kyiv Military History Museum was opened in a rebuilt basement of what is now the National Art Museum of Ukraine. That served as the precedent for the military museum. In September 1996, the Ministry of Defense of Ukraine gave the museum the status of the seniormost museum in the Ukrainian military museum system. For the first time, the museum opened its doors to visitors on 14 June 1998. On 15 January 2010, it was renamed to the National Military History Museum of Ukraine.

Building description
The building was built in a NeoEmpire style; the facade is decorated under the classics. It has more than 150 rooms, as well as large concert hall with a maximum capacity of 1,000 people. It also has the following rooms:

National Military History Museum 
Library of the Cultural, educational and welfare center of Armed Forces of Ukraine
Society of Officers of Ukraine
Lecture Hall
Restaurant

Naming history
 Military Flight School (1914–1934)
All-Ukrainian House of the Red Army (1934–1938)
Kyiv District Orphan Building of the Red Army (1938–1948)
Kyiv District Officers' House (1948–1994)
Center for Culture, Education and Leisure of the Armed Forces of Ukraine (1994–1999)
Central House of Officers of the Armed Forces of Ukraine (1999–present)

Photos

See also
House of Military Officers
Central Armed Forces Museum

References

External links

Official Website of the Museum

Ministry of Defence (Ukraine)
Tourist attractions in Kyiv
Hrushevsky Street (Kyiv)
Pecherskyi District
Buildings and structures completed in 1933
Museums established in 1933
1933 establishments in the Soviet Union
Museums in Kyiv
Buildings and structures in Kyiv
Military locations of the Soviet Union